Consenting Adults is a 1992 American mystery crime-thriller film directed by Alan J. Pakula, and stars Kevin Kline, Mary Elizabeth Mastrantonio, Kevin Spacey and Rebecca Miller. The original music score was composed by Michael Small. The film's tagline is: "Thou shalt not covet thy neighbor's wife."

Plot
Composer Richard Parker and his wife Priscilla live an ordinary suburban life until they meet their new neighbors Eddy and Kay Otis. The two couples become friends. Kay's talent for blues singing gets Richard's attention, while Eddy is attracted to Priscilla. It becomes clear that Eddy is a scam artist when he fakes a neck injury after an auto accident for the insurance proceeds (the majority of which he offers to the Parkers as a gift). Eddy chastises Richard for not living dangerously, and suggests they swap mates for an evening.

The plot takes a nasty turn when Richard does sleep with Kay (supposedly without her realizing that he is not her husband) and Kay turns up dead the next morning, bludgeoned to death by a baseball bat. Later, it is revealed that Eddy spent the night elsewhere in order to establish an airtight alibi. Richard's semen is found in her body, and his fingerprints are on the bat (from when the two couples played a friendly game of softball earlier the previous day), so he's charged with the crime. Priscilla disowns and divorces Richard due to his infidelity. Eddy soon becomes Priscilla's lover and a substitute father to Richard's daughter, Lori.

A distraught Richard finally finds a ray of hope when he hears Kay singing in a radio talent show and realizes she's alive. With the help of private investigator David Duttonville, who was hired by the insurance company from which Eddy is attempting to collect a $1.5 million indemnity claim, Richard tracks her down and learns the truth of how he was betrayed. Kay is guilt-ridden over her part in it, but terrified by Eddy's threat to implicate her if she testifies. Eddy, anticipating what Richard intends to do next, murders Kay and slips away. Implicated in a second murder, Richard flees the scene as police sirens approach.

Priscilla discovers a plane ticket Eddy used on the night of the second murder. Realizing Eddy's guilt, she worries over what to do about it. Richard performs a commando-style raid on Eddy's house, but Eddy, anticipating this move as well, reveals to Priscilla his plan to murder her and shoot Richard as a homicidal intruder. Working together, Richard and Priscilla eventually kill Eddy using the original murder weapon, the baseball bat. Richard and Priscilla are later seen moving into a very secluded house with no neighbors visible for miles.

Cast

 Kevin Kline as  Richard Parker
 Mary Elizabeth Mastrantonio as  Priscilla Parker
 Kevin Spacey as  Eddy Otis
 Rebecca Miller as  Kay Otis
 Forest Whitaker as  David Duttonville 
 E. G. Marshall as  George Gutton
 Kimberly McCullough as  Lori Parker
 Billie Neal as  Annie Duttonville
 Benjamin Hendrickson as  Jimmy Schwartz

Reception
It holds a 23% rating on Rotten Tomatoes from 13 reviews. On Metacritic it has a score of 39% based on reviews from 23 critics, indicating "generally unfavorable reviews."
Gene Siskel and Roger Ebert sharply disagreed on the movie: Siskel found it depressing, mean-spirited and lacking in well-developed characters; Ebert said it was a good thriller with very interesting characters and that "the entire movie is a comedy."

Vancouver Province film critic Michale Walsh panned the film, stating: 'Adults? Pond Scum, Actually.'

Remakes 
The film was remade in Pakistan in 1995 as Jo Darr Gya Woh Marr Gya, starring Jawed Sheikh, Nadeem Baig, Neeli, and Reema Khan. The movie was a hit and earned a golden jubilee. The film's music was composed by Robin Ghosh and Nusrat Fateh Ali Khan. An Indian remake was also made in the 2001, Ajnabee, starring Akshay Kumar, Bobby Deol, Kareena Kapoor, and Bipasha Basu.

References

External links
 
 
 

1992 films
1992 crime thriller films
1990s English-language films
1990s erotic thriller films
1990s psychological thriller films
American crime thriller films
American erotic thriller films
American psychological thriller films
Films directed by Alan J. Pakula
Films scored by Michael Small
Films shot in Georgia (U.S. state)
Films shot in South Carolina
Hollywood Pictures films
1990s American films